Flox may refer to:
FLOX, in chemistry, a combustion process said to reduce nitrogen oxide formation by suppressing peak flame temperatures
Floxing, in biology, a term describing the sandwiching of a DNA sequence between two lox P sites

See also
C-Flox, abrev. for Ciprofloxacin
O-Flox, abrev. for Ofloxacin
FLOX, abrev. for chemotherapy protocol used in the USA (FOLFLOX in EU), containing Fluorouracil,  Leucovorin, Oxaliplatin
Fl-Ox, a fluorine, liquid oxygen mixture (also written as FLOX), a rocket propellant
Floxx, digital media company
Phlox (disambiguation)